Hunter Benjamin Hill (June 21, 1879 – February 21, 1959) was an American professional baseball third baseman, who played in Major League Baseball (MLB) for the St. Louis Browns and Washington Senators between 1903 and 1905.

References

External links

1879 births
1959 deaths
Major League Baseball third basemen
St. Louis Browns players
Washington Senators (1901–1960) players
Shreveport Giants players
Rock Island Islanders players
Corsicana Oil Citys players
Buffalo Bisons (minor league) players
Houston Buffaloes managers
Houston Buffaloes players
Austin Senators players
Dallas Giants players
Baseball players from Austin, Texas